The 2010 Cincinnati Reds season was the 141st season for the franchise in Major League Baseball, and their 8th at Great American Ball Park in Cincinnati. The Reds began their season at home against the St. Louis Cardinals on April 5, losing 11 to 6. Cincinnati was coming off a 78-84 (.481) season and fourth place in the NL Central. The Reds were managed by Dusty Baker, who was in his third season with the team. His coaches were Mark Berry (third base), Billy Hatcher (first base), Brook Jacoby (hitting), Juan Lopez (bullpen), Bryan Price (pitching), and Chris Speier (bench). For the second year in a row, Cincinnati hosted the Major League Baseball Civil Rights Game. They played St. Louis Cardinals and won 4 to 3. The majority owner of the Cincinnati Reds was Robert Castellini; the general manager was Walt Jocketty. Their home field was Great American Ball Park.

The Cincinnati Reds clinched the National League Central division and a trip to the MLB postseason on September 28 by a walk-off home run from outfielder Jay Bruce. This was the first time the Reds were in the postseason since the 1995 season. The 2010 season ended when the Reds were swept by the Philadelphia Phillies in the NLDS.

Offseason 
The 2010 Cincinnati Reds offseason was marked by two key pickups. After acquiring a key player in Scott Rolen midway through the 2009 season, another veteran was added in Orlando Cabrera. In late December 2009, the Reds GM Walt Jocketty made a move to acquire Aroldis Chapman out of Cuba. With the many late season wins in the 2009 season, many picked the Reds to finish higher than they did the previous season.

Regular season

April 
 Opening Day: On Opening Day 2010, the Reds were defeated by their division rival St. Louis Cardinals by a score of 11 to 6, in front of over 42,000 fans at Great American Ball Park. They lost the first series of the season 2 games to 1.
 April 16–18: The Reds were swept in three games against the Pittsburgh Pirates at PNC Park.

May 
 May 10–12: The Reds swept the Pittsburgh Pirates three games to none, after being swept by the same team a few weeks before.
 May 14–16: The Reds take 2 out of 3 from their division rivals, the St. Louis Cardinals. The Reds ended the month of May in first place.

June 
 June 18–20: The Reds ran into trouble during the first stop of their interleague road trip against the Seattle Mariners. They were swept in three games.
 June 21–23: Cincinnati rebounded after the disappointing sweep in Seattle, and swept the Oakland Athletics in three games to close out the AL west coast road trip.

July 
 July 1–7: Cincinnati started the month of July strong. They took 3 out of 4 from the Chicago Cubs and 2 out of 3 from the New York Mets.
 July 8–11: The Reds suffered four straight devastating losses to the Philadelphia Phillies. Starting Pitcher Travis Wood had a spoiled perfect game attempt during this series during the 9th inning of one of the games.
 The All Star Game: The Reds had four all stars that went to Anaheim. They were Joey Votto, Brandon Phillips, Scott Rolen, and Arthur Rhodes. Votto received the final spot in the National League roster after winning a fan vote.

August 
 August 10–12: The Reds were swept three games to none by division rival St. Louis, and dropped out of first place. Derogatory comments about the Cardinals by Reds second baseman Brandon Phillips led to a first inning argument between Phillips and Cardinals catcher Yadier Molina, that turned into a benches-clearing brawl and the suspensions of managers Dusty Baker (Cincinnati) and Tony La Russa (St. Louis), as well as Reds starter Johnny Cueto, who injured Chris Carpenter and Jason LaRue of the Cardinals by kicking with his spikes while pinned against the backstop during the fight. It ultimately led to LaRue's retirement.
 August 13–20: Following the Cardinal's sweep of the Reds, Cincinnati went on to win eight of their next nine games, sweeping both the Florida Marlins and the Arizona Diamondbacks and winning a three-game series against the Los Angeles Dodgers two to one. Homer Bailey returned to the Reds lineup and was the starting pitcher in the third game against the Marlins, pitching a seven inning shutout. Meanwhile, the Cardinals went on to lose six of their next seven games, giving the Reds back the control of the Central Division.

September 
 September 28: The Reds, in first place over the Cardinals by a wide margin, clinched their first division championship since the 1995 season with a dramatic walk-off home run by right fielder Jay Bruce off of Houston Astros left-handed pitcher Tim Byrdak. The first pitch sailed over the wall in center field, clinching the win. The game also featured a home run-robbing, over-the-wall catch by center fielder Drew Stubbs.

The Reds won the National League Central over second-place St. Louis Cardinals by five games.

Standings

Record vs. opponents

Detailed record

Game log 

|-  bgcolor="ffbbbb"
|- align="center" bgcolor="ffbbbb"
| 1 || April 5 || Cardinals (FSO, ESPN) || L 6–11 || Carpenter (1–0) || Harang (0–1) ||  || 42,493 || 0–1
|- align="center" bgcolor="ffbbbb"
| 2 || April 7 || Cardinals (FSO) || L 3–6 || Wainwright (1–0) || Herrera (0–1) || Franklin (1) || 28,132 || 0–2
|- align="center" bgcolor="bbffbb"
| 3 || April 8 || Cardinals || W 2–1 || Cordero (1–0) || Motte (0–1) ||  || 13,445 || 1–2
|- align="center" bgcolor="bbffbb"
| 4 || April 9 || Cubs (FSO) || W 5–4 || Owings (1–0) || Caridad (0–1) || Cordero (1) || 24,419 || 2–2
|- align="center" bgcolor="ffbbbb"
| 5 || April 10 || Cubs (FSO) || L 3–4 || Zambrano (1–1) || Rhodes (0–1) || Mármol (2) || 27,235 || 2–3
|- align="center" bgcolor="bbffbb"
| 6 || April 11 || Cubs (FSO) || W 3–1 || Masset (1–0) || Garbow (0–2) || Cordero (2) || 26,945 || 3–3
|- align="center" bgcolor="bbffbb"
| 7 || April 12 || @ Marlins (FSO) || W 6–5  || Masset (2–0) || Badenhop (0–1) || Cordero (3) || 10,119 || 4–3
|- align="center" bgcolor="bbffbb"
| 8 || April 13 || @ Marlins (FSO) || W 10–8  || Owings (2–0) || Meyer (0–1) || Cordero (4) || 10,681 || 5–3
|- align="center" bgcolor="ffbbbb"
| 9 || April 14 || @ Marlins (FSO) || L 3–5 || Volstad (1–1) || Bailey (0–1) || Badenhop (1) || 14,390 || 5–4
|- align="center" bgcolor="ffbbbb"
| 10 || April 15 || @ Marlins (FSO) || L 2–10 || Johnson (1–1) || Harang (0–2) ||  || 12,912 || 5–5
|- align="center" bgcolor="ffbbbb"
| 11 || April 16 || @ Pirates (FSO) || L 3–4 || Dotel (1–0) || Masset (2–1) ||  || 14,758 || 5–6
|- align="center" bgcolor="ffbbbb"
| 12 || April 17 || @ Pirates (FSO) || L 4–5 || Taschner (1–0) || Cordero (1–1) ||  || 25,196 || 5–7
|- align="center" bgcolor="ffbbbb"
| 13 || April 18 || @ Pirates (FSO) || L 3–5 || Maholm (1–1) || Arroyo (0–1) || Dotel (3) || 13,860 || 5–8
|- align="center" bgcolor="bbffbb"
| 14 || April 20 || Dodgers (FSO) || W 11–9 || Lincoln (1–0) || Troncoso (1–1) || Cordero (5) || 12,965 || 6–8
|- align="center" bgcolor="ffbbbb"
| 15 || April 21 || Dodgers (FSO) || L 6–14 || Kuroda (2–0) || Harang (0–3) ||  || 12,203 || 6–9
|- align="center" bgcolor="bbffbb"
| 16 || April 22 || Dodgers (FSO) || W 8–5 || Leake (1–0) || Kuo (0–1) || Cordero (6) || 13,261 || 7–9
|- align="center" bgcolor="ffbbbb"
| 17 || April 23 || Padres (FSO) || L 4–10 || Correia (3–1)  || Arroyo (0–2) ||  || 15,183 || 7–10
|- align="center" bgcolor="ffbbbb"
| 18 || April 24 || Padres (FSO) || L 0–5 || LeBlanc (1–0)  || Cueto (0–1)  ||  || 19,999 || 7–11
|- align="center" bgcolor="bbffbb"
| 19 || April 25 || Padres (FSO) || W 5–4 || Rhodes (1–1) || Adams (0–1) || Cordero (7) || 17,694  || 8–11
|- align="center" bgcolor="bbffbb"
| 20 || April 27 || @ Astros (FSO) || W 6–2 || Harang (1–3) || Norris (1–2) ||  || 22,467 || 9–11
|- align="center" bgcolor="bbffbb"
| 21 || April 28 || @ Astros (FSO) || W 6–4 || Leake (2–0) || Paulino (0–3) ||  || 21,035 || 10–11
|- align="center" bgcolor="bbffbb"
| 22 || April 29 || @ Astros (FSO) || W 4–2 || Arroyo (1–2) || Oswalt (2–3) || Cordero (8) || 21,493 || 11–11
|- align="center" bgcolor="bbffbb"
| 23 || April 30 || @ Cardinals (FSO) || W 3–2 || Cueto (1–1) || Penny (3–1)  || Cordero (9)  ||  39,850 || 12–11
|-

|-  bgcolor="ffbbbb"
|- align="center" bgcolor="ffbbbb"
| 24 || May 1 || @ Cardinals (FSO) || L 3–6 || Franklin (1–0) || Fisher (0–1) ||  || 41,536 || 12–12
|- align="center" bgcolor="ffbbbb"
| 25 || May 2 || @ Cardinals (FSO) || L 0–6 || Carpenter (4–0) || Harang (1–4) ||  || 43,292 || 12–13
|- align="center" bgcolor="bbffbb"
| 26 || May 3 || Mets (FSO) || W 3–2  || Masset (3–1) || Acosta (1–1) ||  || 14,350 || 13–13
|- align="center" bgcolor="ffbbbb"
| 27 || May 4 || Mets (FSO) || L 4–5  ||Feliciano (1–0)   ||Cordero (1–2)  ||Rodríguez (4)  || 13,813 || 13–14
|- align="center" bgcolor="bbffbb"
| 28 || May 5 || Mets || W 5–4  || Owings (3–0) || Feliciano (1–1) ||  || 16,798 || 14–14
|- align="center" bgcolor="ffbbbb"
| 29 || May 7 || Cubs (FSO) || L 7–14 || Silva (3–0) || Bailey (0–2) ||  || 20,030 || 14–15
|- align="center" bgcolor="bbffbb"
| 30 || May 8 || Cubs (FSO) || W 14–2 || Harang (2–4) || Gorzelanny (1–4) ||  || 29,404 || 15–15
|- align="center" bgcolor="bbffbb"
| 31 || May 9 || Cubs (FSO) || W 5–3 || Leake (3–0) || Dempster (2–3) || Cordero (10) || 20,402 || 16–15
|- align="center" bgcolor="bbffbb"
| 32 || May 10 || @ Pirates (FSO) || W 2–1 || Arroyo (2–2) || Ohlendorf (0–1) || Cordero (11) || 9,045 || 17–15
|- align="center" bgcolor="bbffbb"
| 33 || May 11 || @ Pirates (FSO) || W 9–0 || Cueto (2–1) || Morton (1–6) ||  || 9,027 || 18–15
|- align="center" bgcolor="bbffbb"
| 34 || May 12 || @ Pirates || W 5–0 || Bailey (1–2) || Duke (2–4) ||  || 20,064 || 19–15
|- align="center" bgcolor="ffbbbb"
| 35 || May 14 || Cardinals (FSO) || L 3–4 || García (2–4) || Harang (2–5) || Franklin (8) || 27,568 || 19–16
|- align="center" bgcolor="bbffbb"
| 36 || May 15 || Cardinals (FSO) || W 4–3 || Leake (4–0) || Wainwright (5–2) || Cordero (12) || 41,326 || 20–16
|- align="center" bgcolor="bbffbb"
| 37 || May 16 || Cardinals (FSO) || W 7–2 || Arroyo (3–2) || Penny (3–4) ||  || 26,712 || 21–16
|- align="center" bgcolor="bbffbb"
| 38 || May 17 || Brewers (FSO) || W 6–3 || Cueto (3–1) || Coffey (1–1) || Cordero (13) || 12,409 || 22–16
|- align="center" bgcolor="bbffbb"
| 39 || May 18 || Brewers || W 5–4 || Fisher (1–1) || Hoffman (1–3) ||  || 17,697 || 23–16
|- align="center" bgcolor="ffbbbb"
| 40 || May 19 || @ Braves (FSO) || L 4–5 || Wagner (4–0) || Masset (3–2) ||  || 25,347 || 23–17
|- align="center" bgcolor="ffbbbb"
| 41 || May 20 || @ Braves || L 9–10 || Kimbrel (1–0) || Cordero (1–3) ||  || 21,621 || 23–18
|- align="center" bgcolor="bbffbb"
| 42 || May 21 || @ Indians (FSO) || W 7–4 || Arroyo (4–2) || Laffey (0–1) || Cordero (14) || 23,028 || 24–18
|- align="center" bgcolor="bbffbb"
| 43 || May 22 || @ Indians (FSO) || W 6–4 || Cueto (4–1) || Carmona (4–2) ||  || 25,531 || 25–18
|- align="center" bgcolor="ffbbbb"
| 44 || May 23 || @ Indians (FSO) || L 3–4  || Huff (2–6) || Herrera (0–2) || Wood (1) || 21,044 || 25–19
|- align="center" bgcolor="bbffbb"
| 45 || May 24 || Pirates (FSO) || W 7–5 || Harang (3–5) || Burres (2–2) || Cordero (15) || 13,385 || 26–19
|- align="center" bgcolor="ffbbbb"
| 46 || May 25 || Pirates (FSO) || L 1–2 || Hanrahan (1–0) || Masset (3–3) || Dotel (10) || 14,471 || 26–20
|- align="center" bgcolor="bbffbb"
| 47 || May 26 || Pirates (FSO) || W 4–0 || Arroyo (5–2) || Ohlendorf (0–3) ||  || 18,173 || 27–20
|- align="center" bgcolor="bbffbb"
| 48 || May 27 || Pirates (FSO) || W 8–2 || Cueto (5–1) || Morton (1–9) ||  || 16,834 || 28–20
|- align="center" bgcolor="bbffbb"
| 49 || May 28 || Astros (FSO) || W 15–6 || LeCure (1–0) || Rodríguez (2–7) ||  || 30,813 || 29–20
|- align="center" bgcolor="bbffbb"
| 50 || May 29 || Astros (FSO) || W 12–2 || Harang (4–5) || Moehler (0–2) ||  || 36,918 || 30–20
|- align="center" bgcolor="ffbbbb"
| 51 || May 30 || Astros (FSO) || L 0–2  || Lyon (4–1) || Owings (3–1) ||  Lindstrom (11)  || 36,038 || 30–21
|- align="center" bgcolor="ffbbbb"
| 52 || May 31 || @ Cardinals (FSO) || L 4–12  || García (5–2) || Arroyo (5–3) ||  || 40,782 || 30–22
|-

|-  bgcolor="ffbbbb"
|- align="center" bgcolor="bbffbb"
| 53 || June 1 || @ Cardinals (FSO) || W 9–8 || Del Rosario (1–0) || Reyes (2–1) || Cordero (16) || 37,414 || 31–22
|- align="center" bgcolor="ffbbbb"
| 54 || June 2 || @ Cardinals (FSO) || L 1–4  || Carpenter (7–1) || LeCure (1–1) || McClellan (1) || 39,295 || 31–23
|- align="center" bgcolor=ffbbbb
| 55 || June 4 || @ Nationals (FSO) ||L 2–4 || Clippard (8–3) || Del Rosario (1–1) || Capps (18) || 33,774 || 31–24
|- align="center" bgcolor="bbffbb"
| 56 || June 5 || @ Nationals (FSO) ||W 5–1 || Leake (5–0) || Atilano (5–1) ||  || 22,896 || 32–24
|- align="center" bgcolor="bbffbb"
| 57 || June 6 || @ Nationals (FSO) || W 5–4  || Cordero (2–3) || Slaten (2–1) || Masset (1) || 27,202 || 33–24
|- align="center" bgcolor=ffbbbb
| 58 || June 7 || Giants (FSO) || L 5–6 || Romo (2–3) ||Herrera (0–3) || Wilson (17) || 18,457 || 33–25
|- align="center" bgcolor=ffbbbb
| 59 || June 8 || Giants (FSO) || L 0–3 || Cain (5–4) || LeCure (1–2) ||  || 13,011 || 33–26
|- align="center" bgcolor="bbffbb"
| 60 || June 9 || Giants (FSO) || W 6–3 || Harang (5–5) || Sánchez (4–5) ||  || 14,700 || 34–26
|- align="center" bgcolor="bbffbb"
| 61 || June 10 || Giants || W 7–6 || Rhodes (2–1) || Mota (0–2) || Cordero (17) || 19,241 || 35–26
|- align="center" bgcolor="ffbbbb"
| 62 || June 11 || Royals (FSO) || L 5–6  || Marte (1–0) || Owings (3–2) || Soria (15) || 25,847 || 35–27
|- align="center" bgcolor="bbffbb"
| 63 || June 12 || Royals (FSO) || W 11–5 || Cueto (6–1) || Bannister (6–4) ||  || 34,240 || 36–27
|- align="center" bgcolor="ffbbbb"
| 64 || June 13 || Royals (FSO) || L 3–7 || Greinke (2–8) || LeCure (1–3) || || 23,747 || 36–28
|- align="center" bgcolor="ffbbbb"
| 65 || June 15 || Dodgers (FSO) || L 0–12 || Kuroda (6–4) || Harang (5–6) || || 22,639 || 36–29
|- align="center" bgcolor="ffbbbb"
| 66 || June 16 || Dodgers (FSO) || L 2–6 || Kershaw (7–3) || Leake (5–1) || Kuo (1) || 22,083 || 36–30
|- align="center" bgcolor="bbffbb"
| 67 || June 17 || Dodgers || W 7–1 || Arroyo (6–3) || Ely (3–4) ||  || 25,585 || 37–30
|- align="center" bgcolor="ffbbbb"
| 68 || June 18 || @ Mariners (FSO) || L 0–1 || Lee (5–3) || Cueto (6–2) || || 43,362 || 37–31
|- align="center" bgcolor="ffbbbb"
| 69 || June 19 || @ Mariners (FSO) || L 1–5 || Hernández (5–5) || LeCure (1–4) || || 26,468 || 37–32
|- align="center" bgcolor="ffbbbb"
| 70 || June 20 || @ Mariners (FSO) || L 0–1 || Rowland-Smith (1–6) || Harang (5–6) || Aardsma (15) || 32,712 || 37–33
|- align="center" bgcolor="bbffbb"
| 71 || June 21 || @ Athletics (FSO) || W 6–4  || Cordero (3–3) || Wuertz (2–1) || Smith (1) || 11,088 || 38–33
|- align="center" bgcolor="bbffbb"
| 72 || June 22 || @ Athletics (FSO) || W 4–2 || Arroyo (7–3) || Braden (4–7) || Cordero (18) || 12,136 || 39–33
|- align="center" bgcolor="bbffbb"
| 73 || June 23 || @ Athletics || W 3–0 || Cueto (7–2) || Mazzaro (2–2) || Cordero (19) || 20,824 || 40–33
|- align="center" bgcolor="bbffbb"
| 74 || June 25 || Indians (FSO) || W 10–3 || Harang (6–7) || Laffey (0–2) ||  || 32,844 || 41–33
|- align="center" bgcolor="bbffbb"
| 75 || June 26 || Indians || W 6–4 || Herrera (1–3) || Masterson (2–7) || Cordero (20) || 37,757 || 42–33
|- align="center" bgcolor="ffbbbb"
| 76 || June 27 || Indians (FSO) || L 3-5 || Talbot (8–6) || Arroyo (7–4) || Wood (6) || 25,877 || 42–34
|- align="center" bgcolor="bbffbb"
| 77 || June 28 || Phillies (FSO) || W 7–3 || Cueto (8–2) || Kendrick (4–3) || || 22,090 || 43–34
|- align="center" bgcolor="ffbbbb"
| 78 || June 29 || Phillies (FSO) || L 6–9  || Lidge (1–0) || Rhodes (2–2) || Romero (3) || 26,679 || 43–35
|- align="center" bgcolor="bbffbb"
| 79 || June 30 || Phillies || W 4–3 || Rhodes (3–2) || Halladay (9–7) || Cordero (21) || 27,245 || 44–35
|-

|-  bgcolor="ffbbbb"
|- align="center"  bgcolor="bbffbb"
| 80 || July 1 || @ Cubs (FSO) || W 3–2  || Smith (1–0) || Howry (1–2) || Cordero (22) || 36,880 || 45–35
|- align="center"  bgcolor="bbffbb"
| 81 || July 2 || @ Cubs (FSO) || W 12–0 || Arroyo (8–4) || Dempster (6–7) ||  || 40,361 || 46–35
|- align="center" bgcolor="ffbbbb"
| 82 || July 3 || @ Cubs (FSO) || L 1–3 || Wells (4–6) || Smith (1–1) || Mármol (15) || 40,667 || 46–36
|- align="center" bgcolor="bbffbb"
| 83 || July 4 || @ Cubs (FSO) || W 14–3 || Leake (6–1) || Lilly (3–7) ||  || 41,079 || 47–36
|- align="center" bgcolor="bbffbb"
| 84 || July 5 || @ Mets (FSO) || W 8–6 || Smith (2–1) || Pelfrey (10–3)  || Cordero (23) || 36,764 || 48–36
|- align="center" bgcolor="ffbbbb"
| 85 || July 6 || @ Mets (FSO) || L 0–3 || Santana (6–5) || Maloney (0-1) || || 27,473 || 48–37
|- align="center" bgcolor="bbffbb"
| 86 || July 7 || @ Mets (FSO, ESPN) || W 3–1 || Arroyo (9–4) || Niese (6–3) || Cordero (24) || 30,029 || 49–37
|- align="center" bgcolor="ffbbbb"
| 87 || July 8 || @ Phillies (FSO, MLBN)|| L 3–4  || Figueroa (2–1) || Smith (2–2) || || 45,086 || 49–38
|- align="center" bgcolor="ffbbbb"
| 88 || July 9 || @ Phillies (FSO) || L 7–9  || Madson (2–0) || Rhodes (3–3) ||  || 45,029 || 49–39
|- align="center" bgcolor="ffbbbb"
| 89 || July 10 || @ Phillies (FSO, MLBN) || L 0–1  || Contreras (4–3) || Bray (0–1) || || 45,347 || 49–40
|- align="center" bgcolor="ffbbbb"
| 90 || July 11 || @ Phillies (FSO) || L 0–1  || Hamels (7–7) || Maloney (0–2) || Lidge (6) || 44,913 || 49–41
|- align="center"
|colspan="10" bgcolor="#bbcaff"|July 13: 2010 MLB All-Star Game – Anaheim, California at Angel Stadium (National League: 3, American League: 1)
|- align="center" bgcolor="bbffbb"
| 91 || July 16 || Rockies (FSO) || W 3–2 || Arroyo (10–4) || Hammel (7–4) || Cordero (25) || 37,188 || 50–41
|- align="center" bgcolor="bbffbb"
| 92 || July 17 || Rockies (FSO) || W 8–1 || Vólquez (1–0) || de la Rosa (3–2) ||  || 41,300 || 51–41
|- align="center" bgcolor="ffbbbb"
| 93 || July 18 || Rockies (FSO) || L 0–1 || Cook (5–4) || Wood (0–1) || Street (6) || 25,159 || 51–42
|- align="center" bgcolor="bbffbb"
| 94 || July 19 || Nationals (FSO) || W 7–2 || Cueto (9–2) || Martin (1–5) ||  || 21,243 || 52–42
|- align="center" bgcolor="bbffbb"
| 95 || July 20 || Nationals (FSO) || W 8–7 || Leake (7–1) || Atilano (6–7) || Cordero (26) || 22,876 || 53–42
|- align="center" bgcolor="ffbbbb"
| 96 || July 21 || Nationals (FSO, ESPN) || L 5–8 || Strasburg (5–2) || Arroyo (10–5) || Capps (24) || 37,868 || 53–43
|- align="center" bgcolor="ffbbbb"
| 97 || July 22 || Nationals || L 1–7 || Hernández (7–6) || Vólquez (1–1) ||  || 23,115 || 53–44
|- align="center" bgcolor="bbffbb"
| 98 || July 23 || @ Astros (FSO) || W 6–4 || Ondrusek (1–0) || Byradk (1–1) || Cordero (27) || 30,575 || 54–44
|- align="center" bgcolor="bbffbb"
| 99 || July 24 || @ Astros (FSO) || W 7–0 || Cueto (10–2) || Oswalt (6–12) ||  || 31,552 || 55–44
|- align="center" bgcolor="ffbbbb"
| 100 || July 25 || @ Astros (FSO) || L 0-4 || Rodríguez (8–11) || Leake (7–2) ||  || 25,705 || 55–45
|- align="center" bgcolor="ffbbbb"
| 101 || July 26 || @ Brewers (FSO) || L 1–2 || Villanueva (1–0) || Arroyo (10–6) || Axford (15) || 31,945 || 55–46
|- align="center" bgcolor="bbffbb"
| 102 || July 27 || @ Brewers (FSO) || W 12–4 || Ondrusek (2–0) || Gallardo (9–5) ||  || 32,286 || 56–46
|- align="center" bgcolor="bbffbb"
| 103 || July 28 || @ Brewers (FSO) || W 10–2 || Wood (1–1) || Narveson (8–7) ||  || 38,365 || 57–46
|- align="center" bgcolor="ffbbbb"
| 104 || July 30 || Braves (FSO) || L 4–6  || Chavez (3–2) || Cordero (3–4) || Wagner (24) || 40,373 || 57–47
|- align="center" bgcolor="bbffbb"
| 105 || July 31 || Braves (Fox) || W 5–2 || Arroyo (11–6) || Jurrjens (3–4) || Cordero (28) || 41,611 || 58–47
|-

|-  bgcolor="ffbbbb"
|- align="center" bgcolor="bbffbb"
| 106 || August 1 || Braves (FSO) || W 2–1 || Vólquez (2–1) || Hanson (8–8) || Cordero (29) || 40,871 || 59–47
|- align="center" bgcolor="bbffbb"
| 107 || August 2 || @ Pirates (FSO) || W 4–0 || Wood (2–1) || Ohlendorf (1–9) ||  || 15,172 || 60–47
|- align="center" bgcolor="ffbbbb"
| 108 || August 3 || @ Pirates (FSO) || L 6–7 || Maholm (7–9) || Leake (7–3) || Hanrahan (1) || 13,623 || 60–48
|- align="center" bgcolor="bbffbb"
| 109 || August 4 || @ Pirates || W 9–4 || Cueto (11–2) || Karstens (2-7) || || 20,420 || 61–48
|- align="center" bgcolor="bbffbb"
| 110 || August 6 || @ Cubs (FSO) || W 3–0 || Arroyo (12–6) || Gorzelanny (6–6) || Cordero (30) || 40,696 || 62–48
|- align="center" bgcolor="bbffbb"
| 111 || August 7 || @ Cubs (FSO) || W 4–3 || Ondrusek (3–0) || Wells (5–10) || Masset (2) || 41,227 || 63–48
|- align="center" bgcolor="bbffbb"
| 112 || August 8 || @ Cubs (FSO) || W 11–4 || Wood (3–1) || Diamond (0–2) ||  || 39,016 || 64–48
|- align="center" bgcolor="ffbbbb"
| 113 || August 9 || Cardinals (FSO, ESPN) || L 3–7 || Carpenter (13–3) || Leake (7–4) || || 36,353 || 64–49
|- align="center" bgcolor="ffbbbb"
| 114 || August 10 || Cardinals (FSO) || L 4–8 || García (11–5) || Cueto (11–3) || || 36,964 || 64–50
|- align="center" bgcolor="ffbbbb"
| 115 || August 11 || Cardinals (FSO) || L 1–6 || Wainwright (17–6) || Arroyo (12–7) || || 33,364 || 64–51
|- align="center" bgcolor="bbffbb"
| 116 || August 13 || Marlins (FSO) || W 7–2 || Vólquez (3–1) || Johnson (10–5) || || 29,571 || 65–51
|- align="center" bgcolor="bbffbb"
| 117 || August 14 || Marlins (FSO) || W 5–4 || Leake (8–4) || West (0–2) || Cordero (31) || 37,445 || 66–51
|- align="center" bgcolor="bbffbb"
| 118 || August 15 || Marlins (FSO) || W 2–0  || Bailey (2–2) || Sánchez (9–8) || Cordero (32) || 29,849 || 67–51
|- align="center" bgcolor="bbffbb"
| 119 || August 17 || @ Diamondbacks (FSO) || W 6–2 || Arroyo (13–7) || Hudson (3–1) ||  || 21,502 || 68–51
|- align="center" bgcolor="bbffbb"
| 120 || August 18 || @ Diamondbacks (FSO) || W 11–7 || Rhodes (4–3) || Heilman (3–4) ||  || 15,509 || 69–51
|- align="center" bgcolor="bbffbb"
| 121 || August 19 || @ Diamondbacks (FSO) || W 9–5 || Wood (4–1) || Saunders (1–3) ||  || 17,385 || 70–51
|- align="center" bgcolor="bbffbb"
| 122 || August 20 || @ Dodgers (FSO) || W 3–1 || Bailey (3–2) || Monasterios (3–4) || Cordero (33) || 46,418 || 71–51
|- align="center" bgcolor="ffbbbb"
| 123 || August 21 || @ Dodgers (FSO) || L 5–8 || Billingsley (10–7) || Cueto (11–4) || Broxton (22) || 49,435 || 71–52
|- align="center" bgcolor="bbffbb"
| 124 || August 22 || @ Dodgers (FSO) || W 5–2 || Arroyo (14–7) || Kershaw (11–8) || Cordero (34) || 44,788 || 72–52
|- align="center" bgcolor="ffbbbb"
| 125 || August 23 || @ Giants (FSO, ESPN) || L 2-11 || Cain (10-10) || Vólquez (14–7) ||  || 32,698|| 72-53
|- align="center" bgcolor="ffbbbb"
| 126 || August 24 || @ Giants (FSO) || L 5-16 || Casilla (5-2) || Wood 4-2 ||  || 36,104 || 72-54
|- align="center" bgcolor="bbffbb"
| 127 || August 25 || @ Giants (FSO) || W 12–11  || Cordero (4–4) || Zito (8-9) ||  || 36,310 || 73-54
|- align="center" bgcolor="bbffbb"
| 128 || August 27 || Cubs (FSO) || W 6-1 || Cueto (12–4) || Gorzelanny (7-8) ||  || 36,219 || 74-54
|- align="center" bgcolor="ffbbbb"
| 129 || August 28 || Cubs (FSO) || L 2-3 || Wells (6-12) || Arroyo (14-8) || Mármol (24) || 41,292 || 74-55
|- align="center" bgcolor="bbffbb"
| 130 || August 29 || Cubs (FSO) || W 7-5 || Ondrusek (4-0) || Marshall (6-5) || Cordero (35) || 30,809 || 75-55
|- align="center" bgcolor="bbffbb"
| 131 || August 30 || Brewers (FSO) || W 5–4  || Cordero (5-4) || Hoffman (2-7) || || 14,589 || 76–55
|- align="center" bgcolor="bbffbb"
| 132 || August 31 || Brewers (FSO) || W 8–4 || LeCure (2-4) || Gallardo (11-7) ||  || 19,218 || 77–55
|-

|-  bgcolor="ffbbbb"
|- align="center" bgcolor="bbffbb"
| 133 || September 1 || Brewers (FSO) || W 6–1 || Champman (1–0) || Coffey (2–3) ||  || 16,412 || 78–55
|- align="center" bgcolor="ffbbbb"
| 134 || September 3 || @ Cardinals (FSO) || L 2–3 || García (13–6) || Arroyo (14–9) || Franklin (23) || 43,540 || 78–56
|- align="center" bgcolor="bbffbb"
| 135 || September 4 || @ Cardinals (Fox) || W 6–1 || Wood (5–2) || Wainwright (17–10) || || 44,957 || 79–56
|- align="center" bgcolor="ffbbbb"
| 136 || September 5 || @ Cardinals (FSO) || L 2–4 || Carpenter (15–5) || Bailey (3–2)|| Franklin (24) || 43,963 || 79–57
|- align="center" bgcolor="ffbbbb"
| 137 || September 6 || @ Rockies (FSO) || L 5–10 || Jiménez (18–6) || Bray (0–2) || || 40,237 || 79–58
|- align="center" bgcolor="ffbbbb"
| 138 || September 7 || @ Rockies (FSO) || L 3–4 || Chacín (8-9) || Cueto (12–5) || Street (16) || 29,164 || 79–59
|- align="center" bgcolor="ffbbbb"
| 139 || September 8 || @ Rockies (FSO) || L 2–9 || Cook (6-8) || Arroyo (14-10) ||  || 28,271 || 79–60
|- align="center" bgcolor="ffbbbb"
| 140 || September 9 || @ Rockies || L 5–6 || Belisle (7-5) || Masset (3-4) || Street (17) || 25,213 || 79–61
|- align="center" bgcolor="bbffbb"
| 141 || September 10 || Pirates (FSO) || W 4–3  || Smith (3-2) || Ledezma (0-2) || || 24,908 || 80–61
|- align="center" bgcolor="bbffbb"
| 142 || September 11 || Pirates (FSO) || W 5–4  || Cordero (6-4) || Thomas (0-1) || || 36,101 || 81–61
|- align="center" bgcolor="ffbbbb"
| 143 || September 12 || Pirates (FSO) || L 1-3 || Park (3-3) || Cordero (6-5) || Hanrahan (5) || 26,617 || 81–62
|- align="center" bgcolor="bbffbb"
| 144 || September 13 || Diamondbacks (FSO)||  W 7–2 || Arroyo (15-10) || Enright (6-4)|| || 12,061 || 82–62
|- align="center" bgcolor="ffbbbb"
| 145 || September 14 || Diamondbacks (FSO) || L 1-3 || Hudson (7-2) || Wood (5-3) || Gutierrez (9) || 16,973 || 82–63
|- align="center" bgcolor="bbffbb"
| 146 || September 15 || Diamondbacks (FSO) || W 7-5 || Maloney (1-2) || Saunders (2-6) || Cordero (36) || 19,123 || 83–63
|- align="center" bgcolor="ffbbbb"
| 147 || September 16 || Diamondbacks (FSO) || L 1-3 || Lopez (6-14) || Vólquez (3-3) || Gutierrez (10) || 22,090 || 83–64
|- align="center" bgcolor="ffbbbb"
| 148 || September 17 || @ Astros (FSO)|| L 3-5 || Fulchino (2-0) || Chapman (1-1) || Lyon (17) || 30,218 || 83–65
|- align="center" bgcolor="bbffbb"
| 149 || September 18 || @ Astros (FSO) || W 11-1 || Arroyo (16-10) || Figueroa (5-3) ||  || 29,855 || 84–65
|- align="center" bgcolor="ffbbbb"
| 150 || September 19 || @ Astros (FSO) || L 3-4 || Myers (13-7) || Wood (5-4) || Lyon (18) || 32,520 || 84–66
|- align="center" bgcolor="bbffbb"
| 151 || September 20 || @ Brewers (FSO) || W 5-2 ||  Masset (4-4) || Loe (3-5) || Cordero (37) || 30,024 || 85–66
|- align="center" bgcolor="bbffbb"
| 152 || September 21 || @ Brewers (FSO) || W 4-3 ||  Vólquez (4-3) || Bush (7-13) || Cordero (38) || 22,761 || 86–66
|- align="center" bgcolor="ffbbbb"
| 153 || September 22 || @ Brewers (FSO) || L 1–13 || Wolf (13–11) || Cueto (12–6) || || 27,004 || 86–67
|- align="center" bgcolor="ffbbbb"
| 154 || September 24 || @ Padres (FSO) || L 3–4 || Gregerson (4–7) || Rhodes (4–4) || Bell (44) || 35,310 || 86–68
|- align="center" bgcolor="ffbbbb"
| 155 || September 25 || @ Padres (Fox) || L 3–4 || Bell (6–0) || Chapman (1-2) || || 35,124 || 86–69
|- align="center" bgcolor="bbffbb"
| 156 || September 26 || @ Padres (FSO) || W 12–2 || Bailey (4-3) || Richard (13-9)|| || 26,131 || 87–69
|- align="center" bgcolor="bbffbb"
| 157 || September 28 || Astros (FSO) || W 3–2 || Chapman (2-2) || Byrdak (2-2) ||  || 30,151 || 88–69
|- align="center" bgcolor="ffbbbb"
| 158 || September 29 || Astros (FSO) || L 0-2 || Figueroa (6-4) || Cueto (12-7) || Lyon (20) || 14,760 || 88–70
|- align="center" bgcolor="bbffbb"
| 159 || September 30 || Astros (FSO) || W 9-1 || Arroyo (17-10) || Myers (14-8) ||  || 17,558 || 89–70
|-

|-  bgcolor="ffbbbb"
|- align="center" |- align="center" bgcolor="ffbbbb"
| 160 || October 1 || Brewers (FSO) || L 3-4 (11)|| McClendon (2-0) || Lecure (2-5) || Axford (24) || 28,884 || 89-71
|- align="center" bgcolor="bbffbb"
| 161 || October 2 || Brewers (FSO) || W 7-4 || Ondrusek (5-0) || Coffey (2-4) || Cordero (39) || 28,173 || 90-71
|- align="center" bgcolor="bbffbb"
| 162 || October 3 || Brewers (FSO) || W 3-2 || Maloney (2-2) || Wolf (13-12) || Cordero (40)|| 37,582 || 91-71
|-

 Postseason 

 Game log 

|-  bgcolor="ffbbbb"
|- align="center" bgcolor="ffbbbb"
| 1 || October 6 || @ Phillies (TBS) || L 0–4 || Halladay (1–0) || Vólquez (0–1) ||  || 46,411 || PHI 1–0
|- align="center" bgcolor="ffbbbb"
| 2 || October 8 || @ Phillies (TBS) || L 4–7 || Contreras (1–0) || Chapman (0–1) || Lidge (1) || 46,511 || PHI 2–0
|- align="center" bgcolor="ffbbbb"
| 3 || October 10 || Phillies (TBS) || L 0–2 || Hamels (1–0) || Cueto (0–1) || || 44,599 || PHI 3–0
|- 

 Series Notes 

 National League Division Series: vs. Philadelphia Phillies 

 Game 1 
Wednesday, October 6, 2010 – 5:07 pm (ET) at Citizens Bank Park in Philadelphia, Pennsylvania

In his first career postseason start, Phillies ace Roy Halladay hurled a no-hitter, giving up only one walk (to Jay Bruce in the fifth inning). Halladay's was only the second postseason no-hitter in Major League Baseball history, and the first since Don Larsen's perfect game in the 1956 World Series.

During the 2010 regular season, Halladay had thrown a perfect game on the road against the Florida Marlins on May 29. He thus became the only pitcher to throw a no-hitter or perfect game in the regular season and a no-hitter in the postseason in the same year. Halladay is also the fifth major league pitcher to throw two no-hitters in the same season, and the first since Nolan Ryan in 1973.

 Game 2 
Friday, October 8, 2010 – 6:07 pm (ET) at Citizens Bank Park in Philadelphia, Pennsylvania

On the fourth pitch he saw, Brandon Phillips hit a solo home run to lead off the first inning. This is both the first hit and first run since  for the Reds in the postseason. Laynce Nix scored another run in the top of the second inning on two throwing errors and a wild pitch.

Jay Bruce also hit a lead-off solo homer in the third inning to increase the lead to 3–0. In the top of the fifth inning, Phillips hit a lead-off double, advanced to third base on a sacrifice bunt, then scored on Joey Votto's sacrifice fly.

The Phillies mounted their attack in the bottom of the fifth inning. Pinch-hitter Domonic Brown reached first base on a fielder's choice, then the Phillies loaded the bases on two consecutive defensive errors. Chase Utley delivered a two-out RBI single to get the Phillies on board. But Arroyo struck out Ryan Howard to limit the damage at two.

The Phillies scored again in the sixth inning. Jayson Werth walked, stole second, then scored after two batters were hit by pitches and a bases-loaded walk by Reds relievers Arthur Rhodes and Logan Ondrusek.

The Reds sent flame-thrower Aroldis Chapman to the mound in the bottom of the seventh inning. He hit Chase Utley, the third time by Reds' relievers in the night, then struck out Ryan Howard. Werth hit a ground ball to Reds third baseman Scott Rolen, but Utley was called safe at second base. The next batter Jimmy Rollins hit a fly ball to right field, but the Reds right fielder Jay Bruce lost it in the lights; Reds second baseman Phillips also missed the relay catch. These two crucial errors—the third and fourth on the night—let both Utley and Werth score. Rollins scored later on Raúl Ibañez's single and Carlos Ruiz's RBI force-out. Reds reliever Nick Masset replaced Chapman and got Shane Victorino to ground out to end the inning. The Phillies took the 6–4 lead on Reds' errors into the eighth inning.

In the bottom of the eighth inning, Utley hit a one-out single then stole second. Masset intentionally walked Howard, to set up a potential double play for the next batter. However, Werth hit an RBI single to left field to score Utley.

Phillies closer Brad Lidge closed the ninth for the save.

The six combined errors tied an LDS record previously set by the Athletics and Red Sox in the 2003 ALDS.

 Game 3 
Sunday, October 10, 2010 – 8:07 pm (ET) at Great American Ball Park in Cincinnati, Ohio

Cincinnati was again dominated by Phillies' starting pitching. Cole Hamels pitched a complete game shutout, striking out nine while allowing five hits. Plácido Polanco scored for the Phillies on Orlando Cabrera's throwing error in the top of the first inning. Chase Utley added another run to the lead by hitting a solo home run in the fifth inning.

 Roster 

 Player stats 

 Batting 

 Starters by position 
Note: Pos = Position; G = Games played; AB = At bats; H = Hits; Avg. = Batting average; HR = Home runs; RBI = Runs batted in

Stats through October 3, 2010

 Other batters 
Note: Pos = Position; G = Games played; AB = At bats; H = Hits; Avg. = Batting average; HR = Home runs; RBI = Runs batted in

Stats through October 3, 2010

 Pitching 

 Starting and other pitchers 

G = Games pitched ; IP = Innings pitched ; W = Wins ; L = Losses ; ERA = Earned run average ; SO = Strikeouts ; WHIP = Walks and hits per inning pitched 

Stats Through October 3, 2010

 Relief pitchers 
G = Games pitched ; W = Wins ; L = Losses ; SV = Saves ; IP = Innings pitched ; ERA = Earned run average ; SO = Strikeouts ; WHIP = Walks and hits per inning pitched.

Stats Through October 3, 2010

 Team Leaders/Team Rank 
As of October 3, 2010

 Awards  All-Star  Brandon Phillips – reserve (1st All-Star appearance)
 Arthur Rhodes – pitcher (1st All-Star appearance)
 Scott Rolen – reserve (6th All-Star appearance)
 Joey Votto – reserve (1st All-Star appearance) Hank Aaron Award  Joey Votto – (1st time winner)NL Most Valuable Player Award Joey Votto – (1st time winner) Gold Glove  Bronson Arroyo – P (1st time winner)
 Brandon Phillips – 2B (2nd time winner)
 Scott Rolen – 3B (8th time winner)

 Minor league affiliates 

 Local television Fox Sports Ohio Thom Brennaman—Play-by-Play
 Paul Keels—Play-by-Play
 Jeff Brantley—Color Commentary
 Chris Welsh—Color Commentary
 Jim Day—Reds Live
 Jeff Piecoro—Reds Live

 Local radio Cincinnati Reds Radio Network'''
 Marty Brennaman—Play-by-Play
 Jeff Brantley—Play-by-Play
 Jim Kelch—Play-by-Play

References

External links 
2010 Cincinnati Reds at Baseball Reference
 Official Website

Cincinnati Reds seasons
Cincinnati Reds
National League Central champion seasons
Cinc